Gynoplistia is a genus of crane fly in the family Limoniidae.

Species
Subgenus Cerozodia Westwood, 1835
G. hemiptera (Alexander, 1922)
G. interrupta (Westwood, 1835)
G. laticosta Alexander, 1930
G. paradisea (Edwards, 1923)
G. plumosa (Osten Sacken, 1888)
G. pulverulenta (Edwards, 1923)
Subgenus Dirhipis Enderlein, 1917
G. flavipennis (Philippi, 1866)
G. fusca (Jaennicke, 1867)
G. longiramus Alexander, 1969
G. luteola Alexander, 1971
G. pictipennis (Philippi, 1866)
G. riedeliana (Enderlein, 1917)
G. salgadoi Alexander, 1971
G. striatipennis Alexander, 1928
Subgenus Gynoplistia Westwood, 1835

G. achlys Alexander, 1959
G. aculeata Alexander, 1924
G. aequidentata Alexander, 1971
G. albicincta Edwards, 1923
G. albizonata Alexander, 1938
G. alice Theischinger, 1993
G. alpigena Alexander, 1929
G. ambulator Alexander, 1924
G. angustipennis Edwards, 1924
G. annulata Westwood, 1835
G. anthracina Alexander, 1920
G. apicalis Walker, 1856
G. argyropleura Alexander, 1930
G. arthuriana Edwards, 1923
G. atripes Alexander, 1924
G. attrita Alexander, 1936
G. aurantiocincta Alexander, 1930
G. aurantiopyga Alexander, 1922
G. babinda Theischinger, 1993
G. basispinosa Alexander, 1978
G. basitarsalba Alexander, 1971
G. basituberosa Alexander, 1978
G. bella (Walker, 1835)
G. biangri Theischinger, 1993
G. biarmata Alexander, 1931
G. bickeli Theischinger, 1993
G. bicolor (Philippi, 1866)
G. bidentata Alexander, 1922
G. bilobata Alexander, 1923
G. bimaculata Skuse, 1890
G. bipunctata (Philippi, 1866)
G. biroana Alexander, 1934
G. bispica Alexander, 1960
G. bituberculata Alexander, 1923
G. bona Alexander, 1920
G. boomerang Theischinger, 1993
G. brassi Alexander, 1960
G. bucera Alexander, 1923
G. campbelli Alexander, 1922
G. canterburiana Edwards, 1923
G. capreolus Theischinger, 1993
G. chadwicki Theischinger, 1993
G. chalybeata Alexander, 1947
G. chalybicolor Alexander, 1930
G. chathamica Alexander, 1924
G. cladophora Alexander, 1922
G. clarkeana Alexander, 1951
G. clarki Alexander, 1930
G. clavipes Edwards, 1923
G. collessi Theischinger, 1994
G. concava Alexander, 1922
G. conchyliata Alexander, 1971
G. conjuncta Edwards, 1923
G. costospilota Alexander, 1971
G. cultrata Alexander, 1928
G. cuprea Hutton, 1900
G. cyanea Westwood, 1835
G. cyanoceps Alexander, 1960
G. dactylophora Alexander, 1926
G. davidsoni Alexander, 1929
G. decacantha Alexander, 1960
G. digitifera Alexander, 1953
G. dilatata Alexander, 1924
G. dileuca Alexander, 1947
G. dimidiata Alexander, 1922
G. dispila Alexander, 1923
G. dispiloides Alexander, 1926
G. distinctissima Alexander, 1930
G. dixantha Alexander, 1948
G. doddi Alexander, 1921
G. drekurmi Theischinger, 1993
G. echionis Alexander, 1959
G. elaphus Theischinger, 1993
G. elnorae Alexander, 1929
G. eluta Alexander, 1923
G. erinundra Theischinger, 1993
G. erythrina Alexander, 1930
G. evelynae Alexander, 1947
G. exornata Alexander, 1929
G. fergusoniana Alexander, 1924
G. fimbriata Alexander, 1920
G. flavipes Theischinger, 1993
G. flavizona Alexander, 1948
G. flavofemorata Alexander, 1928
G. flavohalterata Alexander, 1926
G. forceps Alexander, 1931
G. formosa Hutton, 1900
G. frazieri Theischinger, 1993
G. fulgens Hutton, 1900
G. fulva Theischinger, 1993
G. fulviceps Walker, 1861
G. fulviventris Alexander, 1922
G. fumipennis Walker, 1856
G. fuscoplumbea Edwards, 1923
G. galbraithae Alexander, 1929
G. generosa Alexander, 1926
G. gilvipennis Alexander, 1928
G. gingera Theischinger, 1993
G. glauca Edwards, 1923
G. gloriosa Alexander, 1978
G. gnamma Theischinger, 1993
G. habbemae Alexander, 1959
G. hamiltoni Alexander, 1924
G. harrisi Alexander, 1922
G. heighwayi Alexander, 1930
G. hera Alexander, 1959
G. heroni Alexander, 1929
G. hiemalis (Alexander, 1923)
G. hirsuticauda Alexander, 1923
G. hirtamera Alexander, 1922
G. histrionica Alexander, 1928
G. hotooworry Theischinger, 1993
G. howensis Skuse, 1890
G. hyalinata Alexander, 1923
G. hylonympha Alexander, 1929
G. illcha Theischinger, 1993
G. incisa Edwards, 1923
G. inconjuncta Alexander, 1926
G. inflata Alexander, 1926
G. insolita Walker, 1865
G. isolata Theischinger, 1993
G. jocosa Alexander, 1962
G. jucunda Osten Sacken, 1881
G. jucundella Alexander, 1948
G. jurgiosa Walker, 1858
G. kaoota Theischinger, 1993
G. kiandra Theischinger, 1993
G. klamonoensis Alexander, 1951
G. krangalang Theischinger, 1993
G. kraussiana Alexander, 1978
G. kua Theischinger, 1993
G. kundy Theischinger, 1993
G. latibasalis Alexander, 1951
G. leai (Alexander, 1922)
G. leptacantha Alexander, 1959
G. leto Alexander, 1959
G. leucopeza Alexander, 1929
G. lieftinckiana Alexander, 1951
G. lobulifera Alexander, 1923
G. longifurcula Alexander, 1959
G. lowanna Theischinger, 1993
G. luteibasis Alexander, 1922
G. luteicincta Alexander, 1924
G. luteoannulata Alexander, 1936
G. lyrifera Alexander, 1922
G. magnifica Edwards, 1923
G. manicata Alexander, 1929
G. marpanye Theischinger, 1993
G. melancholica Walker, 1864
G. melanopyga Schiner, 1868
G. melape Theischinger, 1993
G. metajucunda Alexander, 1960
G. moanae Alexander, 1951
G. moma Theischinger, 1993
G. monozostera Alexander, 1960
G. moundi Theischinger, 1999
G. murdiella Theischinger, 1993
G. myersae Alexander, 1924
G. narkale Theischinger, 1993
G. neboissi Theischinger, 1993
G. nebulipennis Alexander, 1922
G. nebulosa Edwards, 1923
G. nematomera Alexander, 1926
G. neojucunda Alexander, 1948
G. neonebulosa Alexander, 1923
G. ngende Theischinger, 1993
G. nicholsoni Alexander, 1928
G. nigripennis Alexander, 1926
G. nigrithorax Alexander, 1923
G. nigriventris Alexander, 1948
G. nigrobimbo Alexander, 1923
G. nigronitida Edwards, 1923
G. niveicincta Alexander, 1922
G. nivicola Alexander, 1959
G. notabilis Alexander, 1926
G. notata Edwards, 1923
G. novempectinata Alexander, 1934
G. obscurivena Skuse, 1890
G. occipitalis de Meijere, 1913
G. ocellifera Alexander, 1923
G. octofasciata Brunetti, 1911
G. ofarrelli Theischinger, 1993
G. opima Alexander, 1928
G. orophila Edwards, 1923
G. otagana Alexander, 1930
G. pallidicosta Alexander, 1931
G. pallidistigma Alexander, 1923
G. paluma Theischinger, 1993
G. parajucunda Alexander, 1960
G. patruelis Alexander, 1924
G. pedestris Edwards, 1923
G. penana Alexander, 1967
G. peramoena Alexander, 1959
G. perjucunda Riedel, 1921
G. persephoneia Theischinger, 1993
G. philpotti Alexander, 1939
G. pleuralis Alexander, 1923
G. plumbeicolor Alexander, 1959
G. poenghana Theischinger, 1993
G. polita Edwards, 1923
G. polycantha Alexander, 1959
G. postica Alexander, 1929
G. princeps Alexander, 1923
G. pygmaea Alexander, 1923
G. quagga Theischinger, 1993
G. recurvata Alexander, 1923
G. resecta Edwards, 1924
G. resplendens Alexander, 1951
G. rieki Theischinger, 1993
G. romae Alexander, 1930
G. rubribasis Alexander, 1960
G. sackeni Alexander, 1920
G. schachovskoyana Alexander, 1960
G. scimitar Alexander, 1936
G. sculpturata Alexander, 1929
G. serrulata Alexander, 1926
G. siebersi Edwards, 1927
G. skusei Alexander, 1926
G. speciosa Edwards, 1923
G. speighti Edwards, 1923
G. spinicalcar Alexander, 1922
G. spinigera Alexander, 1922
G. splendens Alexander, 1922
G. subclavipes Alexander, 1924
G. subfasciata Walker, 1848
G. subformosa Alexander, 1924
G. subimmaculata Alexander, 1922
G. subobsoleta Alexander, 1923
G. tenuifilosa Alexander, 1931
G. tenuistylus Alexander, 1929
G. tergogibbosa Alexander, 1971
G. tigris Theischinger, 1994
G. tillyardi Alexander, 1929
G. tooronga Theischinger, 1993
G. toxopei Alexander, 1960
G. tridactyla Edwards, 1923
G. trifasciata Edwards, 1923
G. trispinosa Alexander, 1922
G. tristillata Alexander, 1929
G. troglophila Alexander, 1962
G. tuberculata Edwards, 1923
G. umbacoora Theischinger, 1993
G. unimaculata Alexander, 1922
G. uwinnia Theischinger, 1993
G. variabilis Alexander, 1929
G. variata Alexander, 1931
G. variicalcarata Alexander, 1929
G. varipes Alexander, 1929
G. vigilans Alexander, 1951
G. vilis (Walker, 1835)
G. violacea Edwards, 1923
G. viridis Macquart, 1838
G. viridithorax Skuse, 1890
G. vittinervis Alexander, 1924
G. waigeuensis Alexander, 1947
G. waitakerensis Alexander, 1952
G. wakefieldi Westwood, 1881
G. weiri Theischinger, 1994
G. wilhelmina Alexander, 1959
G. williamsi Theischinger, 2000
G. williamsiana Alexander, 1945
G. wilsonella Alexander, 1930
G. womba Theischinger, 1993
G. woombye Theischinger, 1993
G. xanthocera Alexander, 1947
G. yanka Theischinger, 1993
G. yarra Theischinger, 1993
G. yarrumba Theischinger, 1993
G. yonguldye Theischinger, 1993
G. zebrata Alexander, 1930

Subgenus Xenolimnophila Alexander, 1922
G. fergusoni (Alexander, 1923)
G. flindersi Alexander, 1931
G. paketye Theischinger, 1993
G. tubrabucca Theischinger, 1993
G. zaluscodes (Alexander, 1922)

References

Limoniidae
Nematocera genera
Taxa named by Enrico Adelelmo Brunetti